Coke Studio is a Pakistani television series featuring live music performances. The program focuses on a fusion of the diverse musical influences in Pakistan, including eastern classical, folk, and contemporary popular music. Following is the list of its episodes released till date, along with the songs and singers in correspondence with the seasons and their respective episodes.

Seasons overview

Episodes

Season 1 (2008) 

The first season of Coke Studio began on 7 June 2008 and ended on 4 August 2008. The show was produced by The Coca-Cola Company and Rohail Hyatt. The production team included Rohail Hyatt as the executive producer along with Umber Hyatt being the producer of the show. Natasha De Souza and Naseer-ud-din Wasif served as production team members.

Artists featuring in the show included, Rahat Fateh Ali Khan, Ali Azmat, Ali Zafar, Ustaad H. B Gullo, Saieen Tufail Ahmed, Strings, Sajid & Zeeshan, Saba & Selina and Mauj. The show also featured a house band which had some of the high-profile musicians in the country including, Omran Shafique on guitars, Kamran Zafar on bass guitars, Zeeshan Parwez on keyboards and turntables, Louis 'Gumby' Pinto on drums. Other members of the house band included, Saba Shabbir, Athar Sani and Selina Rashid on backing vocals along with Babar Khanna, Zulfiq 'Shazee' Ahmed Khan and The Abdul Latif Band on percussions.

The first episode aired on 8 June, followed by the second episode on 29 June. The third episode was aired on all locals channels on 20 July and the show came to an end on 4 August, which also rebroadcast three songs, "Sar Kiye" by Strings, "Garaj Baras" by Ali Azmat featuring Rahat Fateh Ali Khan and "Allah Hu" by Tufail Ahmed and Ali Zafar, from the previous episodes.

Season 2 (2009) 

The second series of Coke Studio included notable differences from the first series, including the fact that the live audiences were excluded. The series also ran for longer, this time there were five episodes in total and in each episode there were five or more performances by the featuring artists. Rohail Hyatt returned as the executive producer along with Umber Hyatt as the producer of the show. This series also saw an increase in the number of musicians in the house band. The house band included, Asad Ahmed and Omran Shafique on guitars along with Kamran Zafar on bass guitars, two new members included Jaffar Zaidi on keyboards and Javed Iqbal on violin whereas Louis 'Gumby' Pinto returned on drums and on dholak was Sikander Inam. Other musicians included Natasha De Sousa and Saba Shabbir on backing vocals and on percussions were Babar Khanna, Waris 'Baloo' Ali and Zulfiq 'Shazee' Ahmed Khan.

This series also featured some well known guest musicians which included, sitar player Rakae Jamil, flutist Baqir Abbas, sarangi player Gul Mohammad, Gupreet Channa on tablas and Sadiq Sameer playing the rubab. Also, the second season featured Ali Zafar and Strings performing for the second time at Coke Studio as they were also part of the first season.

The second season began on 14 June 2009 and ended on the Independence Day of Pakistan, 14 August. Each episode was given an individual title and the titles per episode were; Individuality, Harmony, Equality, Spirit and Unity respectively.

Season 3 (2010) 

Coke Studio returned for its third series on 1 June 2010. Rohail Hyatt continued as the executive producer along with Umber Hyatt as the producer of the show. The production team included Naseer-ud-din Wasif as the technical manager, Zeeshan Parwez assisted by Adnan Malik on video production, Danial Hyatt on visual and animations and Selina Rashid with her firm Lotus as public relations.

The third season also saw a change in the house band as Natasha De Souza was replaced by Sanam Saeed and Zoe Viccaji who joined Saba Shabbir on backing vocals. Sikander Mufti joined the crew on percussions with Babar Khanna and Zulfiq 'Shazee' Ahmed Khan. Asad Ahmed and Omran Shafique returned as guitarists along with Kamran Zafar on bass. Jaffar Ali Zaidi and Javed Iqbal stayed on keyboards and violin respectively whereas Gumby remained as the drummer of the show.

This series also featured some well-known guest musicians which included, flutist Baqir Abbas, Sagar Veena player Noor Zehra and Sadiq Sameer playing the rubab. Also, the third season featured a return of Noori, Zeb and Haniya and Arieb Azhar, who were also part of second season of the show. The third season featured five episodes which are titled as Reason, Will, Conception, Form and Realisation, respectively.

Season 4 (2011) 

Rohail Hyatt and his wife Umber Hyatt remained as the producers of the show. The house band recruited drummer Raheel Manzar Paul and vocalist Rachel Viccaji. The house band saw Sanam Saeed and Saba Shabbir leaving the band and the rest of the house band remained unchanged.

Sanam Marvi made a return to the fourth season of the show performing for the second time at Coke Studio, she first appeared in the previous season. Other featured artists in the fourth season included Bilal Khan, progressive metal band Mizraab, Balochi folk singer Akhtar Chanal Zahri, pop rock band Jal from Lahore, Kaavish, Qawwal group of Fareed Ayaz & Abu Muhammad, Asif Hussain Samraat, Komal Rizvi, Sajjad Ali, Mole, QB and eastern classical Punjabi singer Attaullah Khan Esakhelvi.

The second season began on 22 May 2011 and ended on 17 July 2011, featuring a total of five episodes.

Season 5 (2012) 

Coke Studio returned for its fifth series on 13 May 2012. Rohail Hyatt and Umber Hyatt continued as producers of the show. Among the house band, Louis 'Gumby' Pinto left the show due to his being the executive producer of the show Uth Records by Ufone. Jaffer Ali Zaidi also left the show and was replaced by Mubashir Admani. Raheel Manzar Paul and Zulfiq 'Shazee' Ahmed Khan also left the show. Farhad Humuyun was recruited as the new drummer for the fifth series.

The fifth season saw a return of Bilal Khan, Fareed Ayaz & Abu Muhammad, Atif Aslam and Meesha Shafi, all artists having performed previously on Coke Studio. The series also featured international rap musician Bohemia, rock bands Overload and SYMT from Lahore, Punjabi singer Hadiqa Kiani, Pushto pop singer Hamayoon Khan, progressive rock band Qayaas from Islamabad, singers Uzair Jaswal and Rachel Viccaji. Folk singers Tahir Mithu and Chakwal group are also featured artists.

Season 6 (2013) 

Rohail Hyatt and Umber Hyatt continued as producers of the show. Among the house band, Louis 'Gumby' Pinto & Jaffer Ali Zaidi returned to the show on drums and keyboards respectively after their absence from last season. Other members included Asad Ahmed on guitar,Babar Ali Khanna on dholak,Kamran ‘Mannu’ Zafar on bass,Sikandar Mufti on percussions and drums, Omran Shafique on guitar and Zoe Viccaji and Rachel Viccaji on backing vocals The houseband also featured international musicians for the first time in show's history,from countries like Italy, Serbia, Nepal, Turkey, Bangladesh, Morocco and Norway.

The sixth season saw a return of artists like Atif Aslam, Ali Azmat, Zeb & Haniya, Sanam Marvi and Saieen Zahoor. This season marked the first time for foreign artists to be featured on the show,with the likes of Sweden-based Balochi singer Rostam Mirlashari and Turkish singer Sumru Ağıryürüyen.

Season 7 (2014) 

Season seven is produced by Strings (band) as previous seasons producer Rohail Hyatt quits on 22 January 2014. while Coca-Cola returns as an executive producer. The band's duo, Bilal Maqsood and Faisal Kapadia produced the show for the first time, while they briefly appeared as featured artists in season one and season two, the duo took three months to complete the production of series. Season featured twenty-three artists, twenty-two musicians and twenty-eight songs. Also season is revamped with new house bands which includes, musicians, backing vocalists and guest musicians.

Previously it was scheduled to premiere on 7 September 2014 but was delayed due to an ongoing political crisis which has caught the media attention everywhere. Season premiered under the tagline of Sound of the Nation.

Season 8 (2015) 

The debut producers of season 7, Strings duo and series regular producer Coca-Cola continued their journey as producers in this season. Earlier, rumours were made that Rohail Hyatt will be back as a producer this season but he denied rumors saying "Just for the record, I’m not producing the next season of Coke Studio Pakistan (2015). I think the BBC interview is being interpreted by some as if I am producing this season. What I meant to say was that I would like to produce my 7th season of Coke Studio one day. I hope this clears any confusion". The lead bassist Khalid Khan, was ruled out of season 8 due to cervical pain, who was replaced by Kamran ‘Mannu’ Zafar. Season would feature seven episodes comprising thirty-one artists, thirteen musicians and twenty-eight songs.

It aired a weekly episode every Sunday on various channels across Pakistan. Season was revived under the tagline of The Sound of Nation.

Initial promo song
On 4 August 2015 a special tribute to Sohail Rana & Masroor Anwar was presented by reproducing their patriotic song "Sohni Dharti" as a part of Pakistan's 68th Independence celebration. Season also released the promo with the tribute under the tagline of 'Celebrating the spirit of Independence'. "Sohni Dharti"  featured all the artists that were scheduled to lined-up for this season. The promo and tribute release were met with extravagant reception from all over the world. "Sohni Dharti" went viral with in 24-hours of it release, earning wide spread acclaim. The song was declared as "the best of what Coke Studio has ever offered".

Season 9 (2016) 

The ninth season of Coke Studio was again produced by the band Strings and Coca-Cola Company, with six music directors, Noori, Shani Arshad, Jaffer Zaidi, Faakhir, Shiraz Uppal and Shuja Haider. This was the first time in the history of Coke Studio that six musicians served as music directors. The ninth season debuted on 13 August, and its final episode aired on 2 September 2016. Qawwal singer Amjad Sabri, marked his first and final appearance on Coke Studio with the song "Rang". His song was aired posthumously, as he was killed in a gun-firing on 22 June 2016, before the seasons airing. Also in the season, the Indian singer Shilpa Rao, marked her debut on Coke Studio Pakistan, becoming the first singer from India to feature on a Pakistani musical series.

Initial promo song
On 3 August 2016, Coke Studio begin with the promotion of the song "Zalima Coca Cola Pila De". Originally sung by Noor Jehan, the song was recreated by the years featured artists Umair Jaswal and Meesha Shafi. Like the previous season, Coke Studio aired another patriotic song "Ay Rah-e-Haq Haq K Shaheedo" on 6 August 2016 for the celebration of the 69th Independence Day of Pakistan. The song was a tribute to the Pakistan Army as well as to those who died during the partition of India. The song was aired with the theme "Dedicated to those who sacrifice their todays for our tomorrows", and a monologue voiceover of filmmaker Shahzad Nawaz:

Originally sung by Naseem Begum, the recreated version featured all the line-up artists, who were scheduled to feature in Coke Studio. Upon release the song went viral on the internet, garnering more than five million viewers in less than five hours of its release.  Additionally, the song received overwhelming response from both critics and the audience. The Indian newspaper Firstpost called the song "memorable".

The season began airing its weekly episodes Saturdays and releasing all episodes digitally on Fridays a day prior to its original broadcast.

Season 10 (2017) 

The tenth season of Coke Studio was produced by Strings and Coca-Cola Company. It started on 11 August 2017 and ended on It had nine music directors. Shuja Haider, Shani Arshad and Jaffer Zaidi returned with Ali Hamza of band Noori, Meekal Hassan of Meekal Hassan Band, Salman Ahmad of Junoon, Sahir Ali Bagga, Sajjad Ali made their debut as music director. Strings also directed three songs, while also being producers of Coke Studio. A special tribute was given to Mehdi Hassan, Master Inayat Hussain, Noor Jehan, Aamir Zaki, Faiz Ahmed Faiz, Nusrat Fateh Ali Khan, JJ Khan and Vital Signs. Junaid died in a plane crash. Aamir last time appeared in the song Naina Moray before he died of a cardiac arrest. Strings also made an appearance in the song Us Rah Par. They decided to stop adopting this format after this season.

Initial promo song
Just like last two seasons, Coke Studio launched Pakistan National Anthem on 5 August 2017. It was launched to celebrate the 70 years of Pakistan. It featured season artists as well as the music directors. It managed to gain positive reviews.

Season 11 (2018) 

Coke Studio returns with its eleventh edition. Strings stopped producing and Ali Hamza and Zohaib Kazi turned out to be the producers. Many of the singers returned while many of them are made their debuts. For the first time, transgender people performed in the platform. Also, it had a rap song which was also received well by audiences. International band Krewella had also starred in this season.

Preceding the release of season, as a part of a traditional format, Coke Studio revealed this year featured artists performing a rendition of popular nazm, "Hum Dekhenge" by poet Faiz Ahmed Faiz, originally recorded by Iqbal Bano. The promo song also manifests the nation's political situation in the midst of general elections. The song was received well by the critics.

Season 12 (2019) 

The twelfth season of Coke Studio was produced by show's founder Rohail Hyatt and distributed by Coca-Cola Pakistan. Coke Studio 12 ended the tradition of starting a new season with a patriotic song, this tradition was started in season 8. 

The season was opened by Atif Aslam's Wohi Khuda Hai, a Hamd written by Muzaffar Warsi. The twelfth season commenced airing on 11 October 2019 and concluded on 29 November 2019. The season featured 6 episodes and 1 season opener/premiere, making a total of 21 songs.

Season 13 (2020) 

Coke Studio Season 2020 is produced by show's founder Rohail Hyatt and distributed by Coca-Cola Pakistan. The season is referred as Coke Studio 2020 because of coronavirus pandemic. Coke Studio 2020 began airing on 4 December 2020 and concluded on 25th December 2020. The show was opened by an all-female anthem; Na Tutteya Ve, the song speaks about the resilience of women. The season featured 12 original songs, all songs were arranged and produced by Rohail Hyatt..

Season 14 (2022) 

The season consisted of 13 original songs, each with its own unique video directed by some of Pakistan's most innovative directors, such as Jamal Rahman, Kamal Khan, Murtaza Niaz, and Zeeshan Parwez. The season was produced by Xulfi and Abdullah Siddiqui was the associate producer.

Coke Studio Explorer

Explorer (2018) 

Ali Hamza and Zohaib Kazi introduced Explorer 2018 in which they go to different places across Pakistan and discover regional music stories and singers and bring them to the lime light. The show was started on 3 July 2018 and concluded on 17th July 2018. All songs were produced by Ali Hamza & Zohaib Kazi.

Coke Studio Special

Coke Studio Special (2010) 
Coke Studio Special is part of the Coke Studio video web blog series which included special features such as unreleased performances from the second season of the show. The first video blog was released on 15 January 2010 and the last video blog was released on 16 May 2010, on the YouTube channel of the show.

Phir Se Game Utha Dain (2015)

Hum Aik Hain (2019)

Ramadan (2020)

Pakistan Day Special (2021)

Cricket Khidaiye (2021)

See also 

 Coke Studio (Pakistan)
 Rohail Hyatt
 Strings
 Ali Hamza
 Zohaib Kazi
 Music of Pakistan

References

Notes

External links 

 
 

 *
Coke Studio